The Grand Junction Daily Sentinel is the largest daily newspaper in western Colorado, with distribution in six countries.

History
In Bunting of Pennsylvania and Howard T. Lee founded the newspaper in 1893. In 1911, future U.S. Senator Walter Walker bought the newspaper. When he died in 1956, his son, Preston Walker, inherited the Sentinel, managing it until he died in 1970. He left it to newspaper employee Ken Johnson, who sold it the company to Cox Newspapers in 1979.

The new publisher, James C. Kennedy of the Cox family, left to become chairman and CEO of Atlanta-based Cox Enterprises in 1985. The corporation named George Orbanek publisher, who retired in 2007. He was succeeded by Alex Taylor.

Amidst a downturn in the newspaper industry and the Great Recession, Cox put most of its newspaper holdings up for sale. In 2009, it sold the Sentinel to Kansas-based Seaton Publishing Co., a long-standing family newspaper company that publishes the Manhattan Mercury. Jay Seaton was named publisher of The Daily Sentinel and president of the new Grand Junction Media Company.

Awards
In 2017, The Daily Sentinel won the sweepstakes award in the categories of advertising, as well as photography and design from the Colorado Press Association. It also won 27 individual awards, 10 of which were first place winners.

The "Failure to Protect" series, by reporters Erin McIntyre and Gabrielle Porter, won first place for public service and third place for general reporting series from the Society of Professional Journalists' Top of the Rockies competition.

Previous Awards 
The Daily Sentinel in 2015, 2014, 2013, 2012, and 2011 received the General Excellence Award from the CPA, recognizing it as the top daily newspaper in the state with circulation between 15,001 and 75,000.

In 2014, The Daily Sentinel won 51 awards from the CPA, 11 of which were first place winners.

GJSentinel.com won eight awards and finished fifth overall in the 2014 Local Media Association's Best of Digital Media Contest. First place awards included Best Local Community Initiative, Best Use of Multimedia-Editorial Content, and Best Blog Initiative.

Editorial Page Editor Bob Silbernagel in 2013 was honored with the Newspaper Person of the Year Award from the Colorado Press Association, following a 40-year career in newspapers. It is the highest honor granted to a newspaper professional by the trade organization. Publisher Jay Seaton said in his nomination, “For 33 years, Silbernagel has lent his voice to the pages of the Sentinel, and for 18, his has been the voice of the Sentinel.”

Executive Editor Dennis Herzog was named Newspaper Person of the Year in 2008 by the Colorado Press Association. He also served as interim publisher in 2007 and 2008.

Drink It In: Wine Guide of Western Colorado, a book published by the Sentinel and written by Sentinel wine columnist and writer Dave Buchanan, was a 2013 Colorado Book Award Finalist for nonfiction.

Monumental Majesty: 100 Years of Colorado National Monument, a book published by the Sentinel to commemorate the nearby park's 100th anniversary, won the 2011 Colorado Book Award for anthology.

Copy Editor Carrie Marfitano in 2011 was honored with the Rising Star Award from the Colorado Press Association, an honor granted to a journalist with five or fewer years in the industry who exhibits exceptional talent and leadership potential.

In 2007, The Daily Sentinel was named Large Business of the Year by the Grand Junction Area Chamber of Commerce for "the paper's lengthy history of community involvement."

Slogans
Through the years The Daily Sentinel has included a number of slogans or statements on its front page or editorial page. A few that were published:
1894: "The official newspaper of the city of Grand Junction"
1923: "Official newspaper of the county of Mesa" and "Official newspaper of the city of Grand Junction"
1933: Instead of a slogan, the Sentinel ran above its banner, "Yesterday's press run" which was about 6,200 at mid-year.
1943: "Today's news today"
1963: "Read every day by more than 60,000 people in Western Colorado and Eastern Utah"
2003: "Western Colorado's Chronicle of Record since 1893"
2013: "Your community news source since 1893"

In 1909, the Sentinels slogans included:

"1893 - The Leading Newspaper of Western Colorado - 1909"
"News of the Day, the Day it Occurs, that is Real News"
"Beats all other papers. Just 12 Big Hours, That's the Sentinel"
"Exclusive Afternoons Associated Press Report for City of Grand Junction"

The same year, Daily Sentinel invoices included these statements under the paper's name:

"A Paper With A Bonafide Circulation"
"A Paper That Stands Upon Its Merits"

Other publications
The Daily Sentinel publishes a wide-variety of special section glossy magazines including the most popular, Portrait, Vacationland, and Ride magazine, among many others.

In recent years, The Daily Sentinel has authored and published several books pertaining to Western Colorado.

Sandstone to Summit: Colorado and Utah Landscapes through the Lens of Christopher Tomlinson features more than a hundred images. Tomlinson's friend and trail partner, Dave Haynes, tells the stories behind the photos, with insight into flora, fauna and natural phenomena. Once someone leaves the pavement for the trail they may see a three-toed theropod track left in the Jurassic Era to a surprise showing of the Northern Lights.

Drink It In: Wine Guide of Western Colorado, a book published by the Sentinel and written by Sentinel wine columnist Dave Buchanan, was a 2013 Colorado Book Award Finalist for nonfiction. Doug Frost, one of only four people in the world to have achieved both Master Sommelier and Master of Wine, wrote the foreword. The book was designed by graphics editor Robert Garcia and edited by Laurena Mayne Davis. The book profiles all wineries in Western Colorado and includes maps of the four distinct wine regions and a detailed map of the Palisade Fruit and Wine Byway.

Monumental Majesty: 100 Years of Colorado National Monument, a book to commemorate the nearby park's 100th anniversary, won the 2011 Colorado Book Award for anthology. This coffee table book's foreword was written by documentarian Ken Burns, was designed by Graphics Editor Robert Garcia and edited by Laurena Mayne Davis.

Other Grand Junction Media businesses 
Sentinel Digital Agency — In 2016, Grand Junction Media launched a full-service digital marketing agency that focuses on helping businesses with website design, social media marketing, brand development, graphic design, and photography. It is located at 734 S. Seventh St. in Grand Junction. Call 970-256-4387. http://sentineldigitalagency.com/

The Nickel Want Ads — On July 26, 2017, The Nickel Want Ads and https://nickads.com/ moved from their former location at 1635 N. First St. to The Daily Sentinel offices at 734 S. Seventh St. in Grand Junction. The Nickel is a weekly classified advertising newspaper with listings for real estate, merchandise, jobs, pets and more. Call 970-242-5555.

References

External links
 GJSentinel.com
 http://sentineldigitalagency.com/
 https://nickads.com/

Newspapers published in Colorado